The qualification phase of the 2017 Africa U-20 Cup of Nations decided the participating teams of the final tournament. A total of eight teams will play in the final tournament, to be hosted by Zambia.

The draws were conducted during the CAF Executive Committee meeting held on Friday, 5 February 2016 in Kigali, Rwanda.

Participants

Format
Qualification ties were played on a home-and-away two-legged basis. If the aggregate score was tied after the second leg, the away goals rule would be applied, and if still level, the penalty shoot-out would be used to determine the winner (no extra time would be played).

The seven winners of the third round qualified for the final tournament.

First round
The first legs were played on 1, 2 and 3 April, and the second legs were played on 22, 23 and 24 April 2016.

|}

Tunisia won 4–1 on aggregate.

Ethiopia won 4–1 on aggregate.

Gambia won 4–0 on aggregate.

Guinea won 3–1 on aggregate.

Mauritania won 3–2 on aggregate.

Sudan advanced after Kenya were disqualified.

Burundi advanced after DR Congo withdrew.

Uganda won 3–2 on aggregate. However, Rwanda advanced after Uganda were disqualified.

Angola advanced after Chad withdrew.

2–2 on aggregate. Mozambique won on away goals.

Namibia won 4–2 on aggregate.

Zimbabwe won 2–1 on aggregate.

Notes

Second round
The first legs were played on 20, 21 and 22 May, and the second legs were played on 10, 11, 12 and 13 June 2016.

|}

Senegal won 4–1 on aggregate.

Ghana won 5–2 on aggregate.

1–1 on aggregate. Gambia won 7–6 on penalties.

2–2 on aggregate. Guinea won on away goals.

3–3 on aggregate. Burkina Faso won on away goals.

Mali won 7–1 on aggregate.

Sudan advanced after Malawi withdrew.

Nigeria won 3–1 on aggregate.

1–1 on aggregate. Egypt won 3–2 on penalties.

Angola won 3–1 on aggregate.

Lesotho won 2–1 on aggregate.

South Africa won 2–0 on aggregate.

Cameroon won 3–0 on aggregate.

Libya advanced due to FIFA's suspension of Benin.

Third round
The first legs were played on 8, 9 and 10 July, and the second legs were played on 22, 23 and 24 July 2016.

|}

Senegal won 3–2 on aggregate.

Guinea won 2–1 on aggregate.

Mali won 2–0 on aggregate.

5–5 on aggregate. Sudan won on away goals.

Egypt won 5–0 on aggregate.

South Africa won 5–0 on aggregate.

Cameroon won 3–1 on aggregate.

References

External links
 20th Edition Of The U-20 Africa Cup Of Nations, Zambia 2017, CAFonline.com

U-20 Championship qualification
Africa U-20 Cup of Nations qualification
Qualification
2017